Glosselytrodea is an extinct order of insects, containing about thirty species. Its fossil record dates from the Permian to the Upper Jurassic, and is distributed across Eurasia, the Americas, and Australia. Its classification is uncertain, but may be closely related to Neuropterida or Orthoptera.

An ongoing argument about whether this species falls under the Neuropterida or Orthopetra classification has been going on for decades, but scientists refer to its classification through specifies such as wing structure and genetic organization. The Glosselytrodea order resonates to the Neuropterida species through the constructional shape of its wings whilst it is related to the Orthoptera species through the organization of its veins.

References 

Prehistoric insects
Extinct insect orders